Gamshad (also Romanized as Gamshād) is a village in Qorqori Rural District, Qorqori District, Hirmand County, Sistan and Baluchestan Province, Iran. At the 2006 census, its population was 789, in 155 families.

References 

Populated places in Hirmand County